Diplopia is the simultaneous perception of two images of a single object that may be displaced horizontally or vertically in relation to each other. Also called double vision, it is a loss of visual focus under regular conditions, and is often voluntary. However, when occurring involuntarily, it results in impaired function of the extraocular muscles, where both eyes are still functional, but they cannot turn to target the desired object. Problems with these muscles may be due to mechanical problems, disorders of the neuromuscular junction, disorders of the cranial nerves (III, IV, and VI) that innervate the muscles, and occasionally disorders involving the supranuclear oculomotor pathways or ingestion of toxins.

Diplopia can be one of the first signs of a systemic disease, particularly to a muscular or neurological process, and it may disrupt a person's balance, movement, or reading abilities.

Causes
Diplopia has a diverse range of ophthalmologic, infectious, autoimmune, neurological, and neoplastic causes:

Diagnosis
Diplopia is diagnosed mainly by information from the patient. Doctors may use blood tests, physical examinations, computed tomography (CT), or magnetic resonance imaging (MRI) to find the underlying cause.

Classification

One of the first steps in diagnosing diplopia is often to see whether one of two major classifications may be eliminated. That involves blocking one eye to see which symptoms are evident in each eye alone. Persisting blurry or double vision with one eye closed is classified as monocular diplopia.

Binocular 

Binocular diplopia is double vision arising as a result of strabismus(in layman's terms "cross-eyed"), the misalignment of the two eyes relative to each other, either esotropia (inward) or exotropia (outward). In such a case while the fovea of one eye is directed at the object of regard, the fovea of the other is directed elsewhere, and the image of the object of regard falls on an extrafoveal area of the retina. Acute diplopia is a diagnostic challenge. The most common cause of acute diplopia are ocular motor nerve palsies (OMP).

The brain calculates the visual direction of an object based upon the position of its image relative to the fovea. Images falling on the fovea are seen as being directly ahead, while those falling on retina outside the fovea may be seen as above, below, right, or left of straight ahead depending upon the area of retina stimulated. Thus, when the eyes are misaligned, the brain perceives two images of one target object, as the target object simultaneously stimulates different, noncorresponding, retinal areas in either eye, thus producing double vision.

This correlation of particular areas of the retina in one eye with the same areas in the other is known as retinal correspondence. This relationship also gives rise to an associated phenomenon of binocular diplopia, although one that is rarely noted by those experiencing diplopia. Because the fovea of one eye corresponds to the fovea of the other, images falling on the two foveae are projected to the same point in space. Thus, when the eyes are misaligned, two different objects will be perceived as superimposed in the same space. This phenomenon is known as visual confusion'.

The brain naturally guards against double vision. In an attempt to avoid double vision, the brain can sometimes ignore the image from one eye, a process known as suppression. The ability to suppress is to be found particularly in childhood when the brain is still developing. Thus, those with childhood strabismus almost never complain of diplopia, while adults who develop strabismus almost always do. While this ability to suppress might seem an entirely positive adaptation to strabismus, in the developing child, this can prevent the proper development of vision in the affected eye, resulting in amblyopia. Some adults are also able to suppress their diplopia, but their suppression is rarely as deep or as effective and takes much longer to establish, thus they are not at risk of permanently compromising their vision. In some cases, diplopia disappears without medical intervention, but in other cases, the cause of the double vision may still be present.

Certain people with diplopia who cannot achieve fusion and yet do not suppress may display a certain type of spasm-like irregular movement of the eyes in the vicinity of the fixation point (see: Horror fusionis).

Monocular 
Diplopia can also occur when viewing with only one eye; this is called monocular diplopia, or where the patient perceives more than two images, monocular polyopia.  While serious causes rarely may be behind monocular diplopia symptoms, this is much less often the case than with binocular diplopia. The differential diagnosis of multiple image perception includes the consideration of such conditions as corneal surface keratoconus, subluxation of the lens, a structural defect within the eye, a lesion in the anterior visual cortex, or nonorganic conditions, but diffraction-based (rather than geometrical) optical models have shown that common optical conditions, especially astigmatism, can also produce this symptom.

Temporary 
Temporary binocular diplopia can be caused by alcohol intoxication or head injuries, such as concussion (if temporary double vision does not resolve quickly, one should see an optometrist or ophthalmologist immediately). It can also be a side effect of benzodiazepines or opioids, particularly if used in larger doses for recreation, the antiepileptic drugs phenytoin and zonisamide, and the anticonvulsant drug lamotrigine, as well as the hypnotic drug zolpidem and the dissociative drugs ketamine and dextromethorphan. Temporary diplopia can also be caused by tired or strained eye muscles. If diplopia appears with other symptoms such as fatigue and acute or chronic pain, the patient should see an ophthalmologist immediately.

Voluntary 
Some people are able to consciously uncouple their eyes, either by overfocusing closely (i.e., going cross-eyed) or unfocusing.  Also, while looking at one object behind another object, the foremost object's image is doubled (for example, placing one's finger in front of one's face while reading text on a computer monitor). In this sense, double vision is neither dangerous nor harmful, and may even be enjoyable. It makes viewing stereograms possible.

Monocular diplopia may be induced in many individuals, even those with normal eyesight, with simple defocusing experiments involving fine, high-contrast lines.

Treatment

The appropriate treatment for binocular diplopia depends upon the cause of the condition producing the symptoms. Efforts must first be made to identify and treat the underlying cause of the problem. Treatment options include eye exercises, wearing an eye patch on alternative eyes, prism correction, and in more extreme situations, surgery or botulinum toxin.  If your provider diagnoses swelling or inflammation of, or around the nerve, medicines called corticosteroids may be used.

Sometimes, the condition disappears without treatment. If you have diabetes, you'll be advised to keep tight control of your blood sugar level.

The provider may prescribe an eye patch to relieve the double vision. The patch can be removed after the nerve heals.

Surgery or special glasses (prisms) may be advised if there is no recovery in 6 to 12 months.

If diplopia turns out to be intractable, it can be managed as last resort by obscuring part of the patient's field of view. This approach is outlined in the article on diplopia occurring in association with a condition called horror fusionis.

See also 
 Binocular vision
 Monocular rivalry
 Orthoptics

References

Further reading

External links 

 Deciphering Diplopia

Visual disturbances and blindness
Vision